Ponderia elephantina is a species of sea snail, a marine gastropod mollusk in the family Muricidae, the murex snails or rock snails.

Description

Distribution
This marine species occurs off New Caledonia.

References

 Houart, R., 1990. Four new species of Muricidae from New Caledonia. Venus 49(3): 205-214
 Merle D., Garrigues B. & Pointier J.-P. (2011) Fossil and Recent Muricidae of the world. Part Muricinae. Hackenheim: Conchbooks. 648 pp.

Muricidae
Gastropods described in 1990